The FIBA 3x3 Europe Cup had its inaugural tournament in 2014 in Bucharest, Romania. There are two events in the championship, one men's event and one women's event. Each team has four players (three on court and one on the bench). The match is played on a half court and every rule applies as well as a 12-second shot clock and clearance needed on a new possession.

Results

Men's tournament

Women's tournament

Statistics

Medal table

Participation

Men's teams

Women's teams

See also 
 FIBA Europe Under-18 3x3 Championships
 EuroBasket
 EuroBasket Women

References

 
Basketball competitions in Europe between national teams
3x3 basketball competitions
European championships
Recurring sporting events established in 2014
2014 establishments in Europe